Santhià (or  ) is a comune (municipality) in the province of Vercelli in the Italian region Piedmont, located about  northeast of Turin and about  northwest of Vercelli.

Santhià is home to a historic carnival named the Carnevale Storico di Santhià, held since the 14th century.

Main sights
Castle of Vettigné, built starting from the 15th century.
Romanesque-Neoclassic collegiate church of Sant'Agata, built from the 11th century. It includes a 12th-century Romanesque crypt.

People

Jacques-Germain Chaudes-Aigues (1814–1847), French journalist and literary critic, was born in Santhià.
Ugo Nespolo, artist, was made an honorary citizen of Santhià on Saturday 31 March 2012.

References

External links
 Official website